There is a rich and ancient culture in Eastern Arabia. The culture in this region has always been oriented towards the sea.

The semiannual tradition of Qarqe'an (قرقيعان) is deeply rooted in Gulf culture. The Eastern Arabian cuisine includes seafood (including mahyawa), harees, khubz and biryani. Other cultural features of the region include windcatchers (Badgeer) and Dewaniya.

Overview

Cultures in the region include those of Bahrain, southern Iraq, Kuwait, UAE, Eastern Saudi Arabia (Qatif and Al-Hasa), Qatar, and Northern Oman.

Gargee'an

Qarqe'an is an semiannual celebration, observed in Eastern Arabia, that takes place on the 15th night of Sha'ban and on the 15th night of Ramadan. Qarqe'an is marked with children dressing in traditional attire and going door-to-door to receive sweets from neighbours, whilst also singing traditional songs. The tradition has existed for hundreds of years and deeply rooted in Gulf culture.

Although the celebration of Qarqe'an shares superficial similarities with the Halloween custom of trick-or-treating, practiced in some western countries, Qarqe'an has no connection with horror and no associated origin with Halloween.

Music
A variety of music and dance forms are practised in the region, including Fijiri, Fann At-Tanbura, Sawt, contemporary Khaliji music, Yowlah and Liwa.

Musical instruments
Traditional instruments include the Oud, along with a variety of drums and the manjur. The Tanbūra lyre is also used.

Languages
A number of different dialects of Arabic are spoken in the region, including Gulf Arabic and Bahrani Arabic. The Lurs language of Kumzari is also spoken by Omani people of Musandam Peninsula. Kumzari is the only Iranian language native to the Arab world.

Cuisine

Due to the seafaring nature of the Arabs along the eastern Arabian coast, seafood forms the major part of the cuisine of the region. Camel meat and milk also forms a basic staple for all the population, most prominently for bedouins who used to usually breed and sell camels to the rest of the population. Dates are usually consumed as snacks in between meals or offered to guests alongside Arabic coffee in the majlis. Other basic meals are rice and meat, chicken, and strained yogurt. Seafood diet is various with multiple ways to prepare fish for consumption. Squids, oysters, crabs, as well as shrimps all form basic staple food for the coastal Arabs. Harees is also a popular dish in the majority of eastern Arabian households.

Dress

The dress of the region includes long Thobe for men. This is also called Dishdasha in Iraq, Kuwait, Bahrain and Oman. Also a Bisht and Ghutra.

Transport
Traditional transport in the region includes boats such as Dhows and Abras.

Other cultural features
Other cultural features of the region include Qarqe'an, Badgeer wind towers, Bukhoor and Dewaniya.

References

Bibliography

 "The Gulf's Ethnic Diversity: An Evolutionary History" in Security in the Persian Gulf: Origins, Obstacles and the Search for Consensus, Edited by G. Sick and L. Potter, pp. 284.

Middle Eastern culture
Arab culture